Let It Out is the fourth studio album by the German Krautrock band Kraan. It is the first album with Ingo Bischof on keyboards and the last album with saxophonist Johannes Pappert.

Track listing
All songs composed by Kraan.

Side one
 "Bandits in the Woods" – 4:22
 "Luftpost" – 5:12
 "Degado" – 5:00
 "Prima Clima" – 4:41

Side two
 "Let It Out" – 5:48
 "Die Maschine" – 4:42
 "Overseas Bound" – 3:10
 "Picnic International" – 5:23

Personnel
 Peter Wolbrandt – guitar, vocals
 Jan Fride – drums, percussion
 Helmut Hattler – bass
 Johannes Pappert – alto sax
 Ingo Bischof – keyboards

Production
 Conny Planck – recording and mixing
 Petrus Wippel – assistant
 Walter Holzbaur – supervision

References

External links
 

1975 albums
Kraan albums
Intercord albums